Citra may refer to:
 Citra, a historic art that includes paintings, sketching with or without multiple colors
 Citra (drink), a lemon flavored soda sold in India in the late 1980s and early '90s, owned by the Parle group
 Citra (emulator), an experimental Nintendo 3DS emulator
 Citra Awards, or Piala Citra, the annual awards for cinematic achievements in Indonesia
 Citra, Florida, town
 Citra, a beverage by The Coca-Cola Company later rebranded as Fanta Citrus
 Coca-Cola Citra, a Coca-Cola variant manufactured by The Coca-Cola Company
 Astro Citra, Malaysian pay-TV channel 131
 Citra, a variety of hops
 the English guitar
Citra, the name for PK-CLC, the aircraft involved in the crash of Sriwijaya Air Flight 182